Štefan Svitko (born 26 June 1982) in Žaškov, is a Slovak motocyclist. In his racing career he became champion of Slovak republic in enduro and cross country 20 times and he is 3 time champion of European enduro championship. In the 2016 Dakar Rally he made it into second place overall. He had an overall win on stage 10. This feat made Svitko the first Slovak racer to finish on the podium in final classification on the Dakar Rally.

Štefan finished 2020 Dakar Rally 11th overall.

References

1982 births
Living people
People from Dolný Kubín District
Off-road racing drivers
Dakar Rally motorcyclists
Slovak motorcycle racers
Sportspeople from the Žilina Region